Svend Knudsen (18 January 1896 – 28 January 1989) was a Danish footballer. He played in six matches for the Denmark national football team from 1918 to 1919.

References

External links
 

1896 births
1989 deaths
Danish men's footballers
Denmark international footballers
Place of birth missing
Association footballers not categorized by position